Felipe Banguero (born 31 December 1988) is a Colombian professional footballer who plays as defender for Millonarios F.C.

External links 
 

1988 births
Living people
Colombian footballers
Categoría Primera A players
Deportivo Cali footballers
Alianza Petrolera players
Leones F.C. footballers
Millonarios F.C. players
Association football defenders
Footballers from Medellín